Part of the Eighty Years' War, the Capture of Saint Martin was a Spanish naval expedition against the island of Saint Martin, then occupied by the Dutch Republic. The island, claimed by Spain since Christopher Columbus' second voyage to the West Indies in 1493, lies a few hundred miles east of Puerto Rico. Its capture prevented Dutch privateers using it as a base for operations in the Caribbean.

Background
The Dutch Republic had been fighting Spain for its independence since the outbreak of the Eighty Years War in 1568, a conflict which extended into the Spanish Americas. By the 1620s, the Spanish were increasingly concerned by Dutch, French and English incursions into the Caribbean, culminating in the Battle in the Bay of Matanzas in 1628, when the Dutch captured the annual Spanish treasure fleet. 

The Spanish now decided to take action and targeted the Dutch garrison on Saint Martin, which threatened their colony in Puerto Rico. In April 1633, a fleet was sent from Cádiz to expel them, commanded by the Marquess of Cadreita, with the experienced Lope de Hoces as his deputy.

Battle

As the Spanish approached the island on 24 June, reconnaissance showed the Dutch had constructed a 22-gun fortress covering Sint Maarten's approaches, held by a garrison of around 140, which included 40 slaves. Cadreita sent an emissary ashore from the Spanish flagship Nuestra Señora de Aranzazu, to demand the garrison's surrender but although courteously received, their commander van Campen rejected the offer.  

The Spanish ships now began bombarding the fort, allowing them to disembark troops, although seven sailors died in the process. By 2:00 A.M on 25th, 1,000 troops were ashore but the thick undergrowth meant they did not reach the fort until the next day, while suffering a number of deaths from heat exhaustion. Although de Hoces was badly wounded in one of the first exchanges of fire, the Spanish landed four heavier guns which began firing on the fort from close range. 

Since Cadreita was instructed not to spend more than ten days taking the island, the Spanish launched an assault on the night of 30 June. The attack cost them three dead and eighteen wounded, including veteran naval captain Tiburcio Redín. However, van Campen was also injured in the assault and asked for terms of surrender the next day; Cadreita ignored orders to put the garrison to the sword and agreed to take them to the nearest Dutch possession.

Aftermath 
Cadreita occupied the fortress the next day, strengthening its defenses by adding four 24-pounders, four 18-pound demi-culverins, and five 12-to ten-pounders to its armament, plus a permanent garrison of 250 Spanish soldiers and 50 auxiliaries under Captain Cebrián de Lizarazu. The fleet then sailed to San Juan de Puerto Rico, arriving with its prisoners and three Dutch prize ships on 13 July. The Spaniards allowed all inhabitants to leave, hoisted the Spanish flag and read a Holy mass of Gratitude in the fort.

The island was returned to the Dutch Republic by the Peace of Westphalia in 1648.

References

Sources
Lane, E Kris. Pillaging the Empire: Piracy in the Americas 1500-1750. M.E. Sharpe Publishers, 
 
 
 
Hartog, Johannes History of Sint Maarten and Saint Martin

Saint Martin
1633 in the Caribbean
1630s in New Spain
History of Sint Maarten
Saint Martin
Saint Martin
Saint Martin
Saint Martin
Military history of the Caribbean
Eighty Years' War (1621–1648)